The Zazas (also known as Kird, Kirmanc or Dimili) are a people in eastern Turkey who traditionally speak the Zaza language, a western Iranian language written in the Latin script. Their heartland consists of Tunceli and Bingöl provinces and parts of Elazığ, Erzincan and Diyarbakır provinces. Zazas generally consider themselves Kurds, and are often described as Zaza Kurds by scholars.

Etymology and naming 
According to Encyclopædia Iranica the endonym Dimlī or Dīmla was derived from Daylam region in Northern Iran, and appears in Armenian historical records as delmik, dlmik, which was proposed to be derived from Middle Iranian *dēlmīk meaning Daylamite. Among their neighbors the people are known mainly as Zāzā, which meant “stutterer” and was used as a pejorative. Hadank and Mckenzie attribute relative abundance of sibilants and affricates in Zaza language to explain the semantic etymology of the name.

History

Origins and early history 
Linguistic evidence put the urheimat of the Zaza language to Northern Iran, especially around the southern Caspian region due to the similarities between Zaza, Talysh, Gilaki and Mazanderani languages. The etymology of the endonym Dimlī and the historical records of migration from Daylam to Central Anatolia in Armenian sources are also cited as an evidence of Daylamite origins of the Zaza people. Academics propose that this migration event happened in 10th to 12th centuries AD. However, a study from 2005 does not support the Northern Iranian theory and rather proposes a closer link between Kurdish and Zaza-speakers compared to Northern Iranian populations.

Kurmanji-speaking Kurds and Zazas have for centuries lived in the same areas in Anatolia. Arakelova states that Zazas had not claimed a separate ethnic identity from Kurds  and were considered a part of the Kurds by outsiders through history, despite "having a distinct national identity and ethnic consciousness".

The Zaza minstrel tradition goes back to the medieval period, when Zaza-speaking bards composed works both in their mother tongue and in Turkish.

Modern period 
The earliest surviving literary works in the Zaza language are two poems with identical titles, Mawlūd, dating from the late 19th and early 20th centuries.

In the 1920s and 1930s, Zazas played a key role in the rise of Kurdish nationalism with their rebellions against the Ottoman Empire and later the Republic of Turkey. Zazas participated in the Koçgiri rebellion in 1920, and during the Sheikh Said rebellion in 1925, the Zaza Sheikh Said and his supporters rebelled against the newly established Republic because of its Turkish nationalist and secular ideology. Many Zazas subsequently joined the Kurmanji-speaking Kurdish nationalist Xoybûn, the Society for the Rise of Kurdistan, and other movements, where they often rose to prominence.

In 1937 during the Dersim rebellion, Zazas once again rebelled against the Turks. This time the rebellion was led by Seyid Riza and ended with a massacre of thousands of Kurmanji-speaking Kurds and Zaza civilians, while many were internally displaced due to the conflict.

Sakine Cansız, a Zaza from Tunceli, was a founding member of Kurdistan Workers Party (PKK), and like many Zazas joined the rebels, including the prominent Besê Hozat. 

Following the 1980 Turkish coup d'état, many intellectual minorities, including Zazas, emigrated from Turkey towards Europe, Australia and the United States.

Demographics and geographical distribution 

The exact number of Zazas is unknown, due to the absence of recent and extensive census data. The last census on language in Turkey was held in 1965, where 150,644 people ticked Zaza as their first language and 112,701 as their second language. More recent data from 2005 suggests that the Zaza-speaking population varies from approximately 2 to 4 million.

According to a 2015 study that examined the demographics of the voting-age population in the Kurdish inhabited areas in Turkey (Northeast, Central East  and Southeast Anatolia statistical regions, n=1918) 12.8% of the people ethnically identified as Zaza, which made Zaza the biggest ethnic identity after Kurdish (73%) in the region. Zaza speakers were more numerous (15%) compared to people who identify with the Zaza ethnic identity, showing that some Zaza speakers identified as other ethnicities, primarily Kurds.

Following the 1980 Turkish coup d'état, many intellectual minorities, including Zazas, emigrated from Turkey towards Europe, Australia and the United States. The largest part of the Zaza diaspora is in Europe, predominantly in Germany.

Culture

Language 

Zaza is the ancestral language of the Zaza people and belongs to the Zaza–Gorani branch of the Iranian languages. It is spoken in the east of modern Turkey, with approximately 2 to 3 million speakers. There is a division between Northern and Southern Zaza, most notably in phonological inventory, but Zaza as a whole forms a dialect continuum, with no recognized standard.

A study published in 2015 that demographically analysed voting-age adults in the Kurdish inhabited regions of Turkey (excluding diaspora) concluded that 96.2% of people who identified as Zaza, but not Kurdish in the region spoke Zazaki as their mother tongue. On the contrary only 58.4% of the surveyed Zaza people declared that their primary home language was Zazaki, and Turkish was the second most popular home language with 38.3% of Zazas speaking it at their homes. 1.9% of the surveyed people who identified as Zaza expressed that their home language was Kurdish. Around 1.4% people belonging to Kurdish ethnic identity also spoke Zazaki as their mother language. Concerning Alevis, which were separately analysed, c. 70% spoke Zazaki, but Turkish (70%) was the dominant household language. Ziflioğlu states that many Zazas only speak Kurmanji.

The first written statements in the Zaza language were compiled by the linguist Peter Lerch in 1850. Two other important documents are the religious writings of Ehmedê Xasi of 1898, and of Osman Efendîyo Babij; both of these works were written in Arabic script. The state-owned TRT Kurdî airs shows in Zaza. During the 1980s, the Zaza language became popular among the Zaza diaspora, followed by publications in Zaza in Turkey.

Religion 
Predominantly Zazas adhere to Sunni Islam. According to a 2015 study that examined the voting-age adults of the Eastern and Southern Anatolia 75.4% of the people who stated that they were ethnically Zazas belonged to the Shafiʽi school of Islam, similar to Kurdish groups, but in contrast to local Turkish and Arab people who were majority Hanafi. Shafi‘i followers among the Zaza people are mostly Naqshbandi.

Alevism is the second largest Islamic sect among Zazas with 14.8% adhering it, and Zazas had the highest Alevi percentage among any group by far, being followed by Turks (5.4%) and Kurds (3.1%). It was also reported that around 70% of the Alevis spoke Zazaki as their mother language. Zaza Alevis predominantly live around Tunceli Province. Hanafism, which is the biggest Islamic school in both Turkey and among the Turkish and Arabic people in the region, is being adhered by 9.8% of the Zaza population. Historically, a small Christian Zaza population existed in Gerger.

Identity 
According to Kehl-Bodrogi and Arakelova Zazas never claimed a separate existence from Kurds and largely consider themselves Kurds. However, some scholars consider them to be a separate ethnic group, and treat them as such in their academic work.

According to a national survey conducted by KONDA Research and Consultancy in 2019 around 1.5% of the population state "Zaza" as their ethnic identity, thus forming the fourth largest ethnic identity in the country. According to a 2015 survey conducted in Turkish Kurdistan among voting-age adults, the majority of the Zazaki-speakers ethnically identified as "Zaza" in contrast to other options such as Kurdish, Turkish and Arabic.

Many Zaza politicians are also to be found in the fraternal Kurdish parties of the Peoples' Democratic Party (HDP) and Democratic Regions Party (DBP), like Selahattin Demirtaş, Aysel Tuğluk, Ayla Akat Ata and Gültan Kışanak. On the other hand, Zazas who have publicly stated that they do not consider themselves Kurdish include Hüseyin Aygün, a CHP politician from Tunceli. Especially in recent years, Zaza language and cultural associations have become widespread, the establishment of the Federation of Zaza Associations and the establishment of the Democracy Time Party have started to adopt Zaza identity more.

Politics 
Politically, Zazas belonging to Alevism and Sunnism generally hold widely different views from each other. Since 2002 elections Sunni Zazas mostly voted for ruling Justice and Development Party both nationally and locally, meanwhile Alevi Zazas have shown wide support for left-wing or Kurdish-oriented parties, namely HDP and CHP. For the presidential elections Sunni Zazas were reported to be voting for Recep Tayyip Erdoğan, in contrast to the Alevis who mostly supported HDP's candidate Selahattin Demirtaş. Alevi-majority Tunceli is the only province in Turkey that has ever elected a mayor belonging to Communist Party of Turkey.

The first Zaza-oriented political party in the history of Turkey was established in 2017 under the name "Zaza People's Party" and later changed its name to Democracy Time Party (Turkish: Demokrasi Zamanı Partisi) due to legal restrictions on ethnicity-based parties.

Zaza nationalism 

Zaza nationalism is an ideology that supports the preservation of Zaza people between Turks and Kurds in Turkey. Turkish nationalist Hasan Reşit Tankut proposed in 1961 to create a corridor between Zaza-speakers and Kurmanji-speakers to hasten Turkification. In some cases in the diaspora, Zazas turned to this ideology because of the more visible differences between them and Kurmanji-speakers. Zaza nationalism was further boosted when Turkey abandoned its assimilatory policies which made some Zazas begin considering themselves as a separate ethnic group. In the diaspora, some Zazas turned to Zaza nationalism in the freer European political climate. On this, Ebubekir Pamukchu, the founder of the Zaza national movement stated: "From that moment I became Zaza." Zaza nationalists fear Turkish and Kurdish influence and aim at protecting Zaza culture and language rather than seeking any kind of autonomy within Turkey.

According to researcher Ahmet Kasımoğlu, Zaza nationalism is a Turkish and Armenian attempt to divide Kurds.

Genetics 
A 2005 study genetically examined three different groups of Zaza (n= 27) and Kurmanji speakers in Turkey and Kurmanji speakers in Georgia. In the study, mtDNA HV1 sequences, eleven Y chromosome bi-allelic markers and 9 Y-STR loci were analyzed to investigate lineage relationship among these Iranian-speaking groups. According to study 8 different Y-DNA haplogroups have been identified among the Zaza speakers; I* (33.3%), R1a1a (25.9%), E* (11.1%) and R1* (11.1%) being the most prevalent ones.  Haplogroups P1 and J2, which were found to be prevalent among differing Kurdish populations, were absent in Zaza speakers. Y chromosome data showed somewhat different patterns, indicating some effect of geography. Kurmanji speakers and Zaza speakers in Turkey, who are geographic neighbours, were found to be closer to each other compared to the Georgian and Turkmen Kurds according to Y-DNA data.

MtDNA data indicates close relationships among Zaza speaking groups from Turkey and Kurdish people from Georgia, Iran and Eastern Turkey, meanwhile the examined Kurmanji speakers in Turkey and Turkmenistan were different from these groups and each other maternally. Geographic neighbours of Zazas from South Caucasus are also found to be similar concerning mtDNA results. It was stated that there was no clear geographic or linguistic pattern concerning matrilineal origins of examined Iranian-speakers.

Another phenomenon found in the research was that Zazas are closer to Kurdish groups (matrilineally South Caucasian groups, patrilineally Kurmanji speakers in Turkey) rather than peoples of Northern Iran, where ancestral Zaza language hypothesized to be spoken before its spread to Anatolia. It was also stated that "the genetic evidence of course does not preclude a northern Iranian origin for the Zazaki language itself."

See also 
Minorities in Turkey

Notes

Bibliography

Further reading
 I. International Symposium on Zaza Language (2011)
 II. International Symposium on Zaza History and Culture (2012)
 

 Faruk İremet, "Zonê Ma Zazaki" (Dilimiz Zazaca), (Our language Zaza and Zazas
Did a Genocide Take Place in the Dersim region of Turkey in 1938? ÖI Boztas - Strassler Center for Holocaust and Genocide Studies, 2015 - academia.edu
 Munzur Çem, "Kirmanjki (Zazaki) Speaking Kurds And Their Ethnic Identity". Institute Kirmancki (Zazaki)